Papyrus 102 (in the Gregory-Aland numbering), designated by 𝔓102, is an early copy of the New Testament in Greek. It is a papyrus manuscript of the Gospel of Matthew. The surviving texts of Matthew are verses 4:11-12; 4:22-23, they are in a fragmentary condition. The manuscript palaeographically has been assigned to the 3rd century.

Text
The Greek text of the codex is a representative of the Alexandrian text-type.

Location
The manuscript is currently housed at the Sackler Library (Papyrology Rooms, P. Oxy. 4402) at Oxford.

See also 

 List of New Testament papyri
 Matthew 4
 Oxyrhynchus Papyri

References

Further reading 

 Thomas, J. David. The Oxyrhynchus Papyri LXIV (London: 1997), pp. 4–5.

External links

Images 
 P.Oxy.LXIV 4402from Papyrology at Oxford's "POxy: Oxyrhynchus Online" 
 𝔓102 recto 
 𝔓102 verso
 Images of P102 at the Center for the Study of New Testament Manuscripts

Official registration 
 "Continuation of the Manuscript List" Institute for New Testament Textual Research, University of Münster. Retrieved April 9, 2008

New Testament papyri
3rd-century biblical manuscripts
Early Greek manuscripts of the New Testament
Gospel of Matthew papyri